Burn is an American hardcore punk band formed in 1989. After releasing four EPs across three decades, Burn released its first full-length album Do or Die through Deathwish Inc. in 2017.

History
Burn released its first recording, self-titled EP on Revelation Records in 1990. In 1992, the band separated, with vocalist Chaka Malik forming Orange 9mm, guitarist Gavin Van Vlack participating in Pry, Die 116, and The Big Collapse, and drummer Alan Cage in Quicksand. The band never officially disbanded, and after a stint of live performances, Burn was restarted with the addition of guitarist Vic DiCara (from 108 and Inside Out) and bassist Manny Carrero (from Glassjaw). In late 2001, Burn released a new EP on Equal Vision Records, Cleanse. In 2002, the band released a previously unreleased recording from 1992 on Revelation Records entitled, Last Great Sea, due to fans seeking out music which had been circulating among fans from a demo.

In April 2016 the band announced their fourth release, From the Ashes. With founding members Malik and Van Vlack, in addition to new members Tyler Krupsky and Abbas Muhammad, Burn released its first full-length album titled Do or Die on September 8, 2017, through Deathwish Inc. The album was produced by Kurt Ballou and mastered by Howie Weinberg.

Members

Current
 Chaka Malik – vocals
 Gavin Van Vlack – guitar
 Tyler Krupsky – bass
 Abbas Muhammad – drums

Former
 Vic DiCara – guitar
 Manny Carrero – bass
 Alan Cage – drums
 Alex Napack – bass
 Durijah Lang – drums

Discography

Studio albums
 Do or Die (2017, Deathwish)

Extended plays
 Burn (1990, Revelation)
 Cleanse (2001, Equal Vision)
 Last Great Sea (2002, Revelation)
 From the Ashes (2016, Bridge 9)

References

External links
 Burn at Revelation Records

Hardcore punk groups from New York (state)
Revelation Records artists
Equal Vision Records artists